South Ambersham is a hamlet in the Chichester district of West Sussex, England. It lies 0.7 miles (1.2 km) south of the A272 road and 2 miles (3.2 km) east of Midhurst. Until 1844 South Ambersham was a detached part of Hampshire and was a tithing of the parish of Steep.

External links

Villages in West Sussex